Dorian Concept (born Oliver Thomas Johnson, 1984) is an Austrian composer, music producer and keyboardist whose work draws on an eclectic variety of sources including modal and free jazz, funk, hip-hop, electronic, ambient, and soundscape music. Johnson adopted his stage name as a teenager as a reference to the Dorian scale.

Dorian Concept is also a member of the Austrian funk band Jacob's Salty and Bamboozling Ladder (JSBL). He also has periodically toured as a keyboardist for Flying Lotus (along with Richard Spaven on drums) and collaborated with the Cinematic Orchestra.

Biography
Born in Vienna, Johnson studied multimedia art with a focus on acoustic engineering and graphics at the University of Applied Sciences in Salzburg from 2005 to 2009. During this period, he won Elektronikland Salzburg prizes for composition in electronic music in 2005 and 2007 and released his first EP on line in 2006. 

Between 2006 and 2008, he also posted a popular series of five short videos on YouTube under the moniker of "yorktownrecreation" called "Fooling Around on Micro Korg" that show him improvising on the Micro Korg (and other keyboards, such as the Alesis Micron, Korg Nanokey, and Casio SA-21) and totalled over one million views after posting. He is among the self-proclaimed generation of "bedroom producers" who participated in the emergence of an international beat community based the accessibility of digital production technology and early Internet fora, such as MySpace, in the first decade of the 2000s.

In 2007, the BBC Radio 1 producer Benji B "discovered" Dorian Concept at the Red Bull Music Academy in Toronto, where Paul Movahedi, a Viennese bandmate of his and RMBA participant, gave Benji B a CD with 10 unreleased Dorian Concept tracks that Benji B started airing on his show and playing in London clubs. BBC Radio 1's Gilles Peterson also started giving Dorian Concept air-time on his program "Worldwide" and included him in the line-up of worldwide events, and Dorian Concept subsequently started to receive invitations to major electronic music festivals. He also participated in the Red Bull Music Academy in Barcelona in 2008 and has since been involved in a number of Red Bull Music Academy events.

His first album, When Planets Explode, appeared in 2009 preceded and was followed by a number of EPs and remixes. In 2010, Ninja Tune invited him to contribute a track, "Her Tears Taste Like Pears," to its twentieth anniversary box set, Ninja Tune XX, and Ninja released an EP of his under the same title shortly thereafter. He performed at a number of Ninja XX events in Europe in 2010, including the Ninja gala celebration at Royal Albert Hall with the London Metropolitan Orchestra and the Cinematic Orcherstra in November, where he arranged and performed tracks from his Ninja EP for an ensemble including London Metropolitan string quartet accompaniment and the Cinematic Orchestra's saxophonist Tom Chant.

In 2011, Jason Swincoe invited him to continue his collaboration with Cinematic Orchestra by asking him to compose film music (with Tom Chant) for two avant-garde shorts by Peter Tscherkassky, "Outer Space" and "Dream Work," for the Cinematic Orchestra's "In Motion" series in which musicians are asked to compose original scores for classic short films, which also gave him an additional opportunity to perform in a formal concert settings with string accompaniment at the Barbican Centre in London and Tokyo. He also has performed in a more formal setting at the Austrian Cultural Forum in New York City.

As of 2011, his touring and production activity dropped off with the exception of a few remixes, and he spend over two years working on a new sound and material for his second album, Joined Ends, which Ninja Tune released in October 2014. His third album, The Nature of Imitation, was released by Brainfeeder in 2018.

In 2020, his song "You're Untouchable" was featured on Grand Theft Auto Online radio station FlyLo FM, through The Cayo Perico Heist update.

In 2021, he posted on his Facebook page that he has finished working on his next album. Titled What We Do for Others, the album will be released on 28 October 2022 via Brainfeeder.

Style 
Although he had classical piano training as a child, he does not consider himself to be classically trained. As an autodidact, he identifies funk, hip-hop, jazz, and electronica as the primary influences for his music. His music cannot "easily be categorized, yet he has already developed his own, recognisable sound" as Benji B has observed in his blog in 2008.

"Unconventional chord changes, expressive dynamics and quirky layers of counterpoint melodies,..." also have been identified as "...parts of his unmistakable musical voice,..." along with his ability to "...dot effortlessly through different genres and styles: from sublime electronica to hyperactive garage to avant-garde dancehall."

His trademark instrument for production and performance has been the MicroKORG synthesizer. During solo live sets, he has used the Ableton Live software to play his tracks and improvises over them on the MicroKORG or manipulates them with the MicroKORG or the tools available on DJ consoles. On his "minimal set-up", examples are available online.

The release of Joined Ends in 2014 marked a departure from his established musical voice and reliance on the Microkorg as a platform for digital production and performance. Johnson purchased older retro equipment, including a Moog synthesizer, Wurlizter electronic piano, and Roland SH 101, and began to work with analogue media, including his own voice to create "an agile body of work filled with playful melodic earworms, complex textures, and vituosic transformations." Johnson noted that the "new gear was important because the Microkorg . . . really tied me down to my old sound . . . [W]orking with analogue gear was a way for me to put my focus back on playing. It feels like my first musical cycle is closing and the start of a new one." His aspiration was—in comparison to his frentic, established sound club—to "do something simple." His tracks are based on the technique of recording himself performing with analogue media and then "self-sampling" and reworking the analogue material in the course of production. In an interview, he has described himself as "an autodidact jazz musician, who samples himself." To perform this new material and sound, he also developed a new trio stage show with his long-standing Viennese friends and band-mates from JSBL: Paul Movahedi ("The Clonius") on bass and Clemens Bacher ("Cid Rim") on percussion.

After Joined Ends was released, Johnson toured extensively and then dropped out of sight again for over two years to work on The Nature of Imitation, which appeared on his third label, Brainfeeder, as his third LP in 2018. For Johnson, The Nature of Imitation also represented an "aesthetic break" from Joined Ends and a process of "reinvention" that entailed returning "to my old approaches but from a completely different perspective" and resulted in a "brand new sound." This album is a synthesis of the widely disparate stylistic elements from of his previous two albums and simultaneously an expression of the "two Dorian Concepts": ". . . the hectic [one] . . . whirling like a tornado over the keys . . . of a defenseless microsynthisizer" and "the audodidactic, multi-instrumentalist, electronic chamber musician and detail-loving improvisor."

In light of the fact that Johnson has established himself in a distinct niche in the international electronic music scene, he is widely acknowledged by Austrian music critics as the leading Austrian electronic musician and composer of his generation. In 2019, Das Klangforum in Vienna, one of world's leading ensembles for contemporary music, commissioned Johnson to compose a forty-minute piece for a sixteen instrument ensemble: a task which marked a dramatic departure from his previous releases in terms of its format and orchestration. "Hyperopia" consists of eight "scenes" that explore the challenges, contours and interfaces of transcribing the timbres, rhythms, and distinctive voice of Johnson's digitally composed music for acoustic orchestral performance, and it eclectically references a wide spectrum of genres including minimal music, modal jazz, musique conrète, and electronic music from the 1990s. Its world premiere -- originally scheduled for April 2020 at the Konzerthaus in Vienna -- was postponed due to the coronavirus pandemic, and belatedly took place under the auspices of the Transart Festival in Bolazano, Italy, on 9 September 2020, with a repeat performance at the Musikprotokoll Graz on 11 October 2020.

Discography

Albums
When Planets Explode (Kindred Spirits/Nod Navigators, 2009)
Joined Ends (Ninja Tune, 2014)
The Nature of Imitation (Brainfeeder, 2018)
What We Do for Others (Brainfeeder, 2022)

EPs
2 Feet For You, (Circulations, 2008)
The Fucking Formula, (Kindred Spirits/Nod Navigators, 2008)
Maximized Minimalization (Affine Records, 2008)
Sam Irl And Dorian Concept / Echo Skill Hifi - Untitled One / Gecko (Bonzzaj Recordings/A Few Among Others Records, 2008)
Trilingual Dance Sexperience (Affine Records, 2009)
Untitled (TLM Records, 2010)
Her Tears Taste Like Pears (Ninja Tune, 2011)
Toothbrush/Booth Thrust (Brainfeeder, 2019)

Internet releases
Nouns and the Relevance of Wood (2005)
Seek When is Her (2006)
Dorian Concept & Ginga - FM4 Soundpark Studio2 Session 2008
A TrebleO Beat Tape (2008)

Tracks on compilation albums
 "Warm Cookies and Cold Milk" on Barracuda Astronauts, (Vitamine-Source, 2004)
 "I'm a Basketball Mom" on Elevate Compilation, (Elevate, 2008)
 "Sandwich Terror" on Blue Jemz-Beat Machine, (Scion Audio/Visual, 2008)
 "Timetravellin" (Fatima & Dorian Concept) and "Do I know you?" (Fatima, Cohen, Cuthead & Dorian Concept) on Various Assets - Not For Sale: Red Bull Music Academy Barcelona 2008, (RMBA, 2009)
 Synths on "Welcome to a Bluer Blue Sky" on Bluermutt's Decivilize After Consumption, (Nexsound, 2009)
 "Be Tween" on Beat Dimensions, Vol. 2, (Rush Hour, 2009)
 "RE: Haydn Remix" on RE:Haydn, (Deutsche Grammaphone/Universal, 2009)
 "Her Tears Taste Like Pears" on CD 1 of the Ninja Tune XX box, (Ninja, 2010)
 "Harpoon Love" and "Row Out" on JSBL's What a Fine Mess We Made, (Affine, 2011)
 "Outer Space" on The Cinematic Orchestra: In Motion # 1 (featuring Dorian Concept & Tom Chant) [9:26], (Ninja & Beat Records, 2012)
 "Dream Work" on The Cinematic Orchestra: In Motion # 1 (featuring Dorian Concept & Tom Chant) [9:46], (Ninja & Beat Records, 2012)

Remixes
 "Chico" (Dorian Concept Remix) on Fulgeance's Low Club EP (Musique Large, 2008)
 Dabrye, "Game Over" (Dorian Concept remix); Jamie Lidell, "A Little Bit Of Feel Good" (Dorian Concept remix); Phat Kat & Guilty Simpson, "Nightmare" (Dorian Concept remix); Three Six Mafia, "Stay Fly" (Dorian Concept remix) preceding the release of his album, When Planets Explode)
 "Emora" (Dorian Concept Remix) on The Clonius' Adroit Adventures (Ubiquity Records, 2009)
 "The Light" (Dorian Concept Remix) on Some Freak, Andreya Triana & Ritornell's The Light Remixes (Wald Entertainment, 2009)
 "Light Up Bright Fires" (Dorian Concept Remix) on PVT's Light up Bright Fires, (Warp, 2010)
 Dabrye's "Game Over" (Dorian Concept Remix) on Arousal (2) - 404 Mixtape (Error Broadcast, 2010)
 Clifford Gilberto's "Deliver The Weird" (Dorian Concept Remix) on CD 6 of the Ninja Tune XX box, (Ninja Tune, 2010)
 "Draw" (Dorian Concept Remix) on Cid Rim's "Cid Rim", (LuckyMe, 2012)
 Letherette's "D & T" (Dorian Concept Remix), (Ninja Tune, 2013)
Taylor McFerrin – Postpartum (Dorian Concept Remix), (Brainfeeder, 2016)
Chitos Hajime – Honen Bushi (Dorian Concept Remix), (Universal Records) 2019

References

Austrian record producers
Living people
1984 births
Austrian keyboardists
Austrian electronic musicians
Brainfeeder artists
Ninja Tune artists
Austrian jazz keyboardists